Jordan Fauqué (born 26 August 1991) is a French professional footballer who plays as a defender for Championnat National 3 club Déols.

References
Jordan Fauque profile at foot-national.com

1991 births
Living people
Sportspeople from Bouches-du-Rhône
People from Arles
French footballers
Association football defenders
Toulouse FC players
LB Châteauroux players
Rodez AF players
Balma SC players
FC Déolois players
Ligue 2 players
Championnat National 3 players
Championnat National 2 players
Footballers from Provence-Alpes-Côte d'Azur